Austin Brummett (born February 14, 2004) is an American soccer player who plays as a forward for New York Red Bulls II in the USL Championship.

Career

Born in Bow, New Hampshire, Brummett played for Seacoast United before joining the Seattle Sounders FC Academy in 2017. He was called up to the national under-15 team in 2018, alongside teammate Juan Alvarez.

Brummett was signed by the Sounders' reserve team, the Tacoma Defiance of the USL Championship, in March 2019. On April 20, 2019, he made his professional debut for the Tacoma Defiance as a 55th–minute substitute against Phoenix Rising as Tacoma lost 4–0. At the age of 15, Brummett is the youngest player to debut in the USL Championship.

In February 2021, Brummett moved to New York Red Bulls II.

Career statistics

References

External links 
 USSDA profile

2004 births
Living people
American soccer players
Association football forwards
New York Red Bulls II players
People from Bow, New Hampshire
Soccer players from New Hampshire
Tacoma Defiance players
United States men's youth international soccer players
USL Championship players